Paul Shane (born George Frederick Speight; 19 June 1940 – 16 May 2013) was a British actor and comedian. He was known for his television work, in particular playing Ted Bovis in Hi-de-Hi!, a 1980s BBC sitcom.

Early life
Shane was born on 19 June 1940 in Thrybergh, near Rotherham, in the West Riding of Yorkshire. After leaving school in 1955, he was a miner at Silverwood Colliery until he suffered double herniated discs after slipping on soap in the pithead baths in 1967, being pensioned from the coal mines as a result. Two years later he became a professional entertainer. He already had ten years' experience as a part-time entertainer in pubs and clubs in south Yorkshire.

Career
Shane's first appearance, as a singer, was at the Grafton pub — now demolished — in St Ann's Road, Rotherham. His first club booking was at St Ann's Club in Rotherham, for 30 shillings. His transformation from singer to comedian was gradual, starting with his version of "Green, Green Grass of Home", which was straight at first, but ultimately became a send-up of the version by Tom Jones.

Shane played small parts and made guest appearances in television series throughout the 1970s. In May 1979, the comedy writer Jimmy Perry spotted Shane playing Frank Roper in an episode of Coronation Street and offered him the part of Ted Bovis in his new holiday-camp sitcom Hi-de-Hi!. The series ran from 1980 until 1988, when Perry and his co-writer David Croft wrote the pilot of You Rang, M'Lord? and invited Shane to play Alf Stokes. That show ran until 1993.

In 1991, Shane was given his own show, Very Big Very Soon, which ran for one series.

Shane's performance of "You've Lost That Lovin' Feeling" on Pebble Mill at One in 1996 was voted the 72nd-funniest moment on British television in an opinion poll on Channel 4 in 2004.

Between 1995 and 1997, Shane played Jack Skinner in two series of Oh, Doctor Beeching!. Subsequently, he appeared most frequently in theatre, though he also had guest spots in Holby City and Emmerdale.

Shane also appeared in variety theatre in towns including Blackpool in 2006, and in pantomime in Jack and the Beanstalk in 2008. In 2008, he was in an episode of the ITV drama series A Touch of Frost, playing boatsman "Diesel Bob". He was the subject of This Is Your Life in 1981, when he was surprised by Eamonn Andrews in London's Covent Garden.

Personal life
Shane was married to Dorothy Shortt (Born 28 February 1943) from 1961 until her death on 4 April 2001 aged 58.England & Wales, Civil Registration Death Index, 1916-2007 They had three daughters.

On 1 April 1984, he was inducted into the Grand Order of Water Rats.

In May 2009, Shane was admitted to the Northern General Hospital in Sheffield for heart surgery and made a full recovery.

Following another short period of ill-health, he died on 16 May 2013 in a Rotherham hospice, aged 72. His three daughters and six grandchildren survived him. His funeral was held on 31 May 2013 at Rotherham Minster.

Filmography

References

External links
 Official website
 

1940 births
2013 deaths
20th-century English male actors
21st-century English male actors
Actors from Rotherham
English male soap opera actors
English miners
People from Thrybergh